UFC 247: Jones vs. Reyes was a mixed martial arts event produced by the Ultimate Fighting Championship that took place on February 8, 2020 at the Toyota Center in Houston, Texas, United States.

Background
A UFC Light Heavyweight Championship bout between the current two-time champion Jon Jones and Dominick Reyes served as the headliner.

A UFC Women's Flyweight Championship bout between the current champion Valentina Shevchenko and Katlyn Chookagian served as the co-headliner.

While not officially announced by the organization, the promotion was initially targeting a light heavyweight bout between former interim title challenger Ovince Saint Preux and Ryan Spann to take place at the event. However, promotion matchmakers elected to go in another direction and the pairing was scrapped from the event.

A bantamweight bout between Sean O'Malley and José Alberto Quiñónez was originally scheduled to take place at UFC 229. However, it was scrapped after O'Malley failed a United States Anti-Doping Agency (USADA) drug test. The bout was then expected to take place at this event but it was eventually moved to UFC 248 for unknown reasons.

Dhiego Lima was scheduled to face Alex Morono at the event. However, Lima was forced off the card on January 22 with a neck injury. He was replaced by promotional newcomer Khaos Williams.

Jimmie Rivera was scheduled to face Marlon Vera at the event. However, Rivera pulled out of the fight on January 23 citing an injury. In turn, promotion officials elected to remove Vera from the card entirely.

Antonio Arroyo was expected to face Trevin Giles in a middleweight bout at the event. However, Arroyo pulled out a day before the fight due to medical issues. He was replaced by James Krause, who was already in Houston to corner Youssef Zalal.

Results

Bonus awards
The following fighters received $50,000 bonuses.
Fight of the Night: Trevin Giles vs. James Krause
Performance of the Night: Khaos Williams and Mario Bautista

Aftermath
On March 25, it was announced by the Texas Department of Licensing and Regulation (TDLR) that Journey Newson tested positive for marijuana in in-competition drug tests. His victory was also overturned to a no contest and he could face a fine and suspension, likely no longer than 90 days, per Texas regulations.

See also 

 List of UFC events
 List of current UFC fighters
 2020 in UFC

References 

Ultimate Fighting Championship events
2020 in mixed martial arts
2020 in sports in Texas
Mixed martial arts in Houston
Sports competitions in Houston
February 2020 sports events in the United States